Melquiades Dominguez (born October 14, 1978) is an American  muralist, painter, visual artist, feminist, and activist, who has lived in the city of South Tucson, Arizona since 2007. Melquiades is married to Melissa Brown Dominguez. Melquiades and Melissa are co-owners of Galeria Mitolera located in the City of Tucson.

Biography 
Dominguez was born in Glendale, California and in 1980 moved to El Sereno, a neighborhood in the Eastside of Los Angeles. They started their career as a graffiti artist going by the graffiti name "Melo" in all their murals and artworks. In 2002, Dominguez received an Associate of Arts degree in Graphic Design from PLATT University in Eagle Rock, California. In that same year, Dominguez was doing the J. Paul Getty Museum internship at Self Help Graphics & Art in East Los Angeles. Dominguez was raised primarily by the grandfather who taught them to use visual art to communicate. The grandfather also introduced them to the Los Angeles Public Library. Their grandfather was the author of the Ulysses Guide to the Los Angeles River, which he published under the faux author name of Ulysses L. Zemanova in 2008.

Art 

 2015 Speaking for the Dead, ASU School of Human Evolution & Social Change, Innovation Gallery, Tempe, Arizona
 2014 Eco-Themed Mural, Manzo Elementary School,  Tucson, Arizona
Arizona Highway, 2012 collected by Los Angeles County Museum of Art

References

Notes

Further reading 
https://tucson.com/news/local/netos-tucson-chicanx-artist-makes-her-mark/article_3dccc673-a8da-5e2a-bcb8-72e50fedaf1a.html

External links 

Wikipedia Student Program
American people of Mexican descent
Artists from Los Angeles
Chicana feminism
Paper art
Non-binary artists
Non-binary activists
1978 births
Living people